Borden Memorial Hospital was a hospital in Lanzhou, Gansu, China from 1918 to 1951.  It was founded by the China Inland Mission with money donated by the Borden family after the death of William Whiting Borden. Borden had meant to come to China as a missionary, but died in Cairo, Egypt while studying Arabic to prepare himself to serve the Muslims of China.  The hospital was handed over to the Chinese government in 1951.

History
The hospital was completed on 9 April 1918 as the first hospital in Gansu. It was a predecessor to the Second People's Hospital of Lanzhou, which took over the hospital in 1951.  In this hospital was an outdoor corridor lined with pictures of Chinese patients helped by all the missionary doctors.   The words: "For God so love the World in Chinese still hangs over the corridor." The hospital was handed over to the Chinese government in 1951. In 1970, it became the Lanzhou Infectious Disease Hospital and in 1978 it was renamed the Lanzhou Second People's Hospital.

CIM Hospital staff
Mary Weightman Nurse in Charge (1934-?)
Isabella Marion Davidson Nurse
Otto F. Schoerner Business Manager (1948-1951)

See also
List of Christian Hospitals in China

References

Hospitals established in 1918
Buildings and structures in Lanzhou
Hospitals in Gansu
Defunct hospitals
Mission hospitals
Hospitals disestablished in 1951